Kenan Simambe (23 August 1974 – April 27, 1993) was a Zambian footballer and member of the national team.  He was among those killed in the crash of the team plane in Gabon in 1993.

Career
Simambe played for Zambia in the 1994 FIFA World Cup qualifying rounds, scoring a goal against Namibia on 30 January 1993.

References

1993 deaths
Zambian footballers
Zambia international footballers
Victims of aviation accidents or incidents in Gabon
Association footballers not categorized by position
Footballers killed in the 1993 Zambia national football team plane crash
1974 births